Amanda Kloots (born March 19, 1982) is an American television personality, dancer, actress and fitness instructor. Since 2021, she has been a co-host of the daytime talk show The Talk.

Early life
Kloots is the second youngest of five children. She attended GlenOak High School in Plain Township, Stark County, Ohio.

Career
Kloots performed as part of the ensemble in several musicals on Broadway, including Good Vibrations, Follies, Young Frankenstein, and Bullets Over Broadway. She is a former member of the dance company the Rockettes.

In 2020, Kloots launched a digital fitness brand, which includes exercise videos taught by her. That same year, she served as a guest co-host on the CBS daytime talk show The Talk. Kloots joined The Talk as a permanent co-host in January 2021. She released a memoir, co-authored with her sister, titled Live Your Life, in June 2021. Later that year, she participated as one of the celebrities competing on season 30 of the competition series Dancing with the Stars, ultimately placing fourth.

Personal life
Kloots was married to actor David Larsen for six years. She was later married to actor Nick Cordero from 2017 until his death in 2020; the two met while working on Bullets Over Broadway. She received attention for documenting Cordero's struggle and death from COVID-19-related complications on Instagram. The couple had a son born 10 June 2019 via C-section. She lives in Los Angeles.

Kloots endorsed Joe Biden in the 2020 United States presidential election.

Filmography

Theatre credits

References

External links

1982 births
Living people
21st-century American actresses
21st-century American dancers
American exercise instructors
American female dancers
American musical theatre actresses
American television talk show hosts
The Rockettes